Alaska 2 Tha Bay is a 2006 album by Hyphy Bay Area rapper Meezy Montana presented by Mac Dre.

Track listing
 "Major Factorz" (featuring Meez & Young Zee)
 "Run Fo' It" (performed by Meez)
 "Playin' Games" (performed by Joker the Bail Bondsman)
 "Pop Tha Most" (featuring Fed-X, Rydah J. Klyde & Meez)
 "Capture Me" (performed by Meez)
 "Diary of a D-Boy" (performed by Meez)
 "Goin' Thru" (performed by Messy Marv, Meezy Montana & Johnny Ca$h )
 "Very Hot" (featuring Bavgate)
 "Alaska 2 Tha Bay" (performed by Rydah J. Klyde featuring Bavgate)
 "Gotta Get It" (performed by Joker the Bail Bondsman)
 "On the Grind" (performed by Meez)
 "Game" (performed by Mistah F.A.B. featuring Rydah J. Klyde, The Fast Gunna, Buddah Mack & Meez)
 "Been Did It" (performed by Meez)
 "What Up" (performed by Meez)
 "Ball Out" (performed by Meez)
 "707" (performed by Turf Talk featuring Young Dru & Goldie)
 "Be Alright" (performed by Meez)
 "Drugge Fresh" (performed by Meez)
 "Treat Yourself" (performed by Meez)
 "Game Goes" (featuring Mistah F.A.B. & Miami)

2006 albums
Mac Dre albums
Thizz Entertainment albums